Hirotami (written: 広民 or 啓民) is a masculine Japanese given name. Notable people with the name include:

 (born 1964), Japanese baseball player
 (1737–1800), Japanese government official

Japanese masculine given names